Georg Blumauer (born 16 July 1974) is a former professional tennis player from Austria.

Biography
Born in Vienna, Blumauer competed mostly as a doubles player on the professional circuit. He made the quarter-finals with Gerald Mandl at the Austrian Open Kitzbühel in 1996. It was Mandl that he partnered in his only Davis Cup appearance, a doubles loss to the Black brothers, Byron and Wayne, in a 1997 World Group qualifier against Zimbabwe in Harare. At the 1998 CA-TennisTrophy in Vienna, Blumauer and Thomas Buchmayer competed as wildcards and upset fourth seeds Donald Johnson and Francisco Montana in the first round. He won the doubles title at the 1999 Nettingsdorf Challenger, with Alexander Peya.

Challenger titles

Doubles: (1)

See also
List of Austria Davis Cup team representatives

References

External links
 
 
 

1974 births
Living people
Austrian male tennis players
Tennis players from Vienna